Laura Anne Walker (born July 1, 1970) is an American former competition swimmer and Olympic medalist.

Walker was a member of the third-place United States women's relay team that won the bronze medal in the women's 4×100-meter freestyle relay at the 1988 Summer Olympics in Seoul, South Korea.  Her winning teammates included Mary Wayte, Dara Torres and Mitzi Kremer.

Walker accepted an athletic scholarship to attend the University of Florida in Gainesville, Florida, where she swam for the Florida Gators swimming and diving team in National Collegiate Athletic Association (NCAA) competition under coach Randy Reese and coach Skip Foster from 1988 to 1992.  Walker was a member of the Gators' 1989 NCAA championship 4x200-yard freestyle relay team, and four Southeastern Conference (SEC) championship relay teams in 1989 and 1992.  In four years as a Gator swimmer, she received seven All-American honors.

Walker graduated from the University of Florida with a bachelor's degree in health science education in 1994.

See also 

 List of Olympic medalists in swimming (women)
 List of University of Florida alumni
 List of University of Florida Olympians

References

External links 

 
 

1970 births
Living people
American female freestyle swimmers
Florida Gators women's swimmers
Olympic bronze medalists for the United States in swimming
Swimmers at the 1988 Summer Olympics
Place of birth missing (living people)
Medalists at the 1988 Summer Olympics